Myron P. Zalucki  (pronounced Meron; born 26 May 1954) is an Australian professor emeritus of entomology at the University of Queensland (UQ).  Zalucki is a Fellow of the Entomological Society of America, a member and secretary of the Council of the International Congresses of Entomology, and a co-editor of the Annual Review of Entomology.

Early life and education
Myron Philip Zalucki was born on 26 May 1954  in Canberra, Australia.

Zalucki attended Australian National University (ANU) in Canberra, Australia, receiving his B.Sc. (first class honours) in zoology in 1976.  He then attended Griffith University in Brisbane, Australia, earning his Ph.D. in ecology in 1982.

Career
Zalucki joined the Department of Entomology at the University of Queensland (UQ) with a temporary position in 1981. He reached the rank of full professor in the School of Biological Sciences at the University of Queensland in 2001.

Research
Zalucki is internationally recognized for his work on insect-plant interactions, primarily in members of the order Lepidoptera including monarch butterflies (Danaus plexippus) and  pests such as Helicoverpa armigera in the family Noctuidae, and  Diamondback moth (Plutella xylostella). He has also studied fruit flies. His laboratory carries out field research and laboratory experiments to better understand the ecology of insects.

As an insect ecologist he uses ecosystem models 
such as ecological niche modelling to understand and predict the behavior of insect populations as an ecological system, and the underlying processes that influence them. He often uses Monarch butterflies and milkweed as a model study system.

Zalucki explores issues such as the spatial characteristics of milkweed planting and their impact on  monarch butterfly movement and egg-laying; the influence of weather patterns on migration; and the impact of spatial-temporal climatic variability. He is known for incorporating movement patterns and behavior into agent-based models. 
Zalucki has also studied oviposition behaviour and the interactions of oviposition, landscape characteristics, climate, and learning, with caterpillar survival, insect abundance and species distribution.

Awards
2018. Fellow of the Entomological Society of America
1996,  Ian MacKerras Medal for excellence in Entomology, Australian Entomological Society

References

1954 births
Living people
Australian entomologists
Australian National University alumni
Griffith University alumni
Academic staff of the University of Queensland
Fellows of the Entomological Society of America
Annual Reviews (publisher) editors